Prince Hamzah Hospital is a 436 bed hospital located in the Jordanian capital, Amman. Established in 2006, the cost of its construction and equipment amounted to 56 million Jordanian dinars (approximately US$75 million).

The facility received recognition from the Jordanian Medical Council as an educational hospital in 2010. It is a government hospital with a decentralization system, which helps to provide medicines, medical consumables and modern devices by placing direct bids, without waiting for the arrangements of the Ministry of Health, as well as the use of experts and technicians from inside and outside the hospital.

Medical services
The hospital provides a treatment service that is not available in the public health sector, including cardiac surgeries, cardiac catheters, diagnostic and therapeutic blood vessels, and kidney transplants.

References 

Hospitals in Amman